Prima donna, Italian for "first lady", is a term used in opera.

Prima Donna or Primadonna may also refer to:

Music 
 Prima Donna (American band), an American rock 'n' roll band
 Prima Donna (UK band), a band that represented the United Kingdom in the Eurovision Song Contest 1980
 Prima Donna (opera), a 2009 opera by Rufus Wainwright
 Prima Donna: A Symphonic Visual Concert, a 2015 concert by Rufus Wainwright, based on his opera

Albums
 Prima Donna (Nine Muses album), 2013
 Prima Donna (Rufus Wainwright album), 2015
 Prima Donna (EP), by Vince Staples, 2016
 Prima Donna, a series of five albums by Leontyne Price, 1967–1978
 Prima Donna, by Lesley Garrett, 1992

Songs
 "Prima Donna" (Uriah Heep song), 1975
 "Primadonna" (Alla Pugacheva song), the Russian entry in the Eurovision Song Contest 1997
 "Primadonna" (Marina and the Diamonds song), 2012
 "Prima Donna", by Chevelle from Hats Off to the Bull, 2011
 "Prima Donna", by Chicago from Chicago 17, 1984
 "Prima Donna", by Christina Aguilera from Bionic, 2010
 "Prima Donna", by Hot Leg from Red Light Fever, 2009
 "Prima Donna", from the musical The Phantom of the Opera, 1986

Other 
 Prima Donna (cheese), a Dutch cheese brand
 Prima Donna (film), a 1959 Australian television play
 Prima Donnas, a 2019 Philippine TV drama series
 Primadonna, a defunct casino once located on the site of the Montage Reno, Nevada, US
 Primadonna, a 1956 typeface designed by the German foundry Ludwig & Mayer

See also 
 "Donna the Prima Donna", a 1963 song by Dion
 Pre-Madonna, a 1997 album by Madonna
 Prima Doner, a fictional takeaway shop on ITV1 soap opera Coronation Street, owned by Dev Alahan